Victoria is the smallest mainland state in Australia.  it contained  separate protected areas with a total land area of  (17.26% of the state's area). Of these, 45 were national parks, totalling  (11.32% of the state's area).

The parks are managed by Parks Victoria, a state government agency. There are also many smaller state areas which are subject to commercial activity such as logging.

Coastal and marine parks
The state of Victoria has protected approximately 5.3% of coastal waters. In June 2002, legislation was passed to establish 13 marine national parks and 11 marine sanctuaries. Victoria is the first jurisdiction in the world to create an entire system of highly protected marine national parks at the same time.

Historic and heritage areas and parks
 Beechworth Historic Park
 Castlemaine Diggings National Heritage Park
 Nyerimilang Heritage Park
 Oriental Claims Historic Area
 Point Gellibrand Coastal Heritage Park
 Steiglitz Historic Park
 Walhalla Historic Area
 Upper Goulburn Historic Area
 Whroo Historic Reserve
 Woodlands Historic Park

Indigenous Protected Areas

Indigenous Protected Areas (IPAs) are "areas of land and sea managed by Indigenous groups as protected areas for biodiversity conservation through voluntary agreements with the Australian Government". The following IPAs have been declared in Victoria:

Deen Maar
Framlingham Forest
Kurtonitj
Lake Condah
Tyrendarra

National parks

As of 2011 there are 45 national parks in Victoria.

State parks

Metropolitan parks

Reference areas inside other protected areas

 Ah Kows Gully
 Anser Island
 Baawang
 Barga
 Baw Baw
 Beehive Creek
 Benedore River
 Berrook
 Big River
 Blue Rag
 Blue Range
 Boiler Plain
 Broombush
 Buangor
 Buenba
 Bungil
 Burnside
 Calder River
 Carpendeit
 Chalka Creek
 Chiltern Box-Ironbark
 Cobboboonee
 Cooriemungle
 Crinoline Creek
 Danyo
 Dattuck
 Deep Creek
 Diamond Creek
 Disappointment
 East Caledonia
 Enfield
 Entrance Point
 Forest Hill
 French Island (East)
 French Island (North)
 Gelantipy Plateau
 Grasstree Creek
 Hollands Knob
 Jemba
 Jilpanger
 Joey Creek
 Jones Creek
 Kamarooka
 Keegans Bend
 Kentbruck Heath
 Kia
 Kooyoora
 Korong Vale
 Lagoon Plateau
 Lake Jerriwirrup
 Lake Walla Walla
 Little Desert (East)
 Little Desert (West)
 Macks Creek
 Merragunegin
 Millewa
 Millewa South
 Moora Valley
 Morkalla
 Mount Buffalo
 Mount Crozier
 Mount Gregory
 Mount Mcadam
 Mount Pleasant
 Mountain Creek
 Mullungdung
 Musket Creek
 Olangolah Creek
 O'Sullivans Lookout
 Patterson River
 Parker River
 Pine Mountain
 Porphyry Hill
 Pretty Creek
 Purnya
 Raak Plain
 Rocket Lake
 Rudds Rocks
 Ruths Gully
 Seal Creek
 Settlement Road
 Shepherds Creek
 Stony Creek (Otways)
 Stony Creek (Kinglake)
 Sunset
 Terrick Terrick
 The Sisters
 The Stones
 Tom Groggin
 Tomahawk Creek
 Tooan
 Top End
 Top Island
 Toupnein Creek
 Vereker Creek
 Walsh Creek
 Warby Range
 Watts Creek
 White Box Ridge
 Whiterock Creek
 Winnot Creek
 Wombat Creek
 Wonnangatta River
 Yambulla
 Zig Zag Creek

Reference areas outside other protected areas

 Beear
 Bennie Creek
 Burbibyong Creek
 Cambatong
 Concordia Gully
 Cudgewa Creek
 Drum Top
 Dry Forest Creek
 Durdidwarrah
 Eaglehawk Creek
 Glen Creek
 Hawthorn Creek
 Killawarra
 King
 Lightwood
 Lucyvale Creek
 Mitta Mitta
 Mount Separation
 Musk Creek
 Pilot Range
 Pyrete Range
 Roseneath
 Rushworth Forest
 Ryans Creek
 Sandhurst
 Spring Creek
 Stringybark Creek
 Stony Creek (Durdiwarrah)
 Tambo River
 Tarpaulin Bend
 Telopea Downs
 Thirteen Mile Spur
 Toorour
 Twenty Acre Creek
 Yan Yean North
 Yan Yean South

Wilderness parks
 Avon
 Big Desert
 Wabba

Wilderness zones inside other protected areas

 Bowen
 Buchan Headwaters
 Cape Howe
 Chinaman Flat
 Cobberas
 Galpunga
 Genoa
 Indi
 Minook
 Mount Cowra
 Mount Darling - Snowy Bluff
 North Wyperfeld
 Razor-Viking
 Sandpatch
 Snowy River
 South Wyperfeld
 Sunset
 Tingaringy

Nature conservation reserves
There are 328 nature conservation reserves including:
Deep Lead Nature Conservation Reserve
 Jackass Flat Nature Conservation Reserve
 Long Forest Nature Conservation Reserve
 Mount Elizabeth Nature Conservation Reserve
 Mount Hope Nature Conservation Reserve
Mullinger Swamp Conservation Park 
 Spit Nature Conservation Reserve
 Yellingbo Nature Conservation Reserve

Natural feature reserves
There are  natural feature reserves.

See also
 Protected areas of Australia
 Royal Botanic Gardens, Melbourne

References

External links
 Parks Victoria
 Victoria National Parks

 
Victoria
Protected areas